Doug Lancio is a guitarist and record producer, based in Nashville, Tennessee. He has worked with a wide range of artists including John Hiatt, Nanci Griffith, Patty Griffin and Bob Dylan.

Biography

Questionnaires
Lancio was a member of the 1980s group Questionnaires, along with Tom Littlefield (guitar, vocals), Chris Feinstein (bass), and Hunt Waugh (drums).

Bedlam
With guitarist Jay Joyce and bassist Chris Feinstein, Lancio formed the group Bedlam in 1991. They released an eponymous EP and the album Into the Coals, both on MCA. Bedlam also recorded music for the soundtrack album of the film Reservoir Dogs: "Harvest Moon" and a cover of "Magic Carpet Ride."

Touring and recording
Lancio has toured and recorded with a number of noted artists. In the mid-'90s he was a member of Tommy Womack's touring and recording band.

Lancio has been a member of John Hiatt's touring bands since 2008. Lancio also produced Hiatt's 2014 album Terms of My Surrender.

Lancio has had a long professional working relationship with Patty Griffin. He first played with Patty on her Silver Bell album, and contributed to other recordings, such as Flaming Red, Children Running Through, Downtown Church, and American Kid. He produced 1000 Kisses and her live album A Kiss in Time.

Lancio has also toured with Tom Jones in support of his recent recordings.

Lancio played guitar with Bob Dylan during the first leg of his Rough and Rowdy Ways World Wide Tour beginning on November 2, 2021.

Awards
Lancio was nominated for the 2013 Americana Music Award for Instrumentalist of the year.

Studio G
Lancio maintains Studio G (in partnership with Patty Griffin), a Nashville recording studio that features a Trident 324 mixing console, Studer A827 analog tape recorder, and Telefunken V76 preamps.

Discography

As a member of the Questionnaires
Albums
 1989: Window to the World (EMI USA)
 1991: Anything Can Happen (EMI USA)
Singles
 1989: "Window To The World (LP Version)" / "Window To The World (Edited Version)" (EMI USA)
 1989: "Teenage Head" (EMI USA) 12" promo

As a member of Bedlam
Albums
 1992: Into The Coals (MCA)
EPs
 1991: Bedlam (MCA)
Singles
 1992: "Heaven" (MCA)

As producer
 2002: Patty Griffin – 1000 Kisses (ATO)
 2003: Matthew Ryan – Regret Over the Wires (Hybrid Recordings)
 2003: Patty Griffin – A Kiss in Time (ATO)
 2005: RobinElla – Solace For The Lonely (Dualtone)
 2007: The Greencards – Viridian (Dualtone)
 2007: Gretchen Peters – Burnt Toast & Offerings (Scarlet Letter / Curb)
 2008: Matthew Ryan – Matthew Ryan vs. The Silver State (One Little Indian)
 2008: Todd Snider – Peace Queer (Aimless)
 2009: Matraca Berg – South Of Heaven (self-released, later became The Dreaming Fields)
 2009: Jack Ingram – Big Dreams & High Hopes (Big Machine)
 2011: Ian McFeron – Summer Nights (self-released)
 2011: Matraca Berg – The Dreaming Fields (Dualtone) - track 10 ("South Of Heaven")
 2012: Gretchen Peters – Hello Cruel World (Scarlet Letter)
 2013: Ian McFeron – Time Will Take You (self-released)
 2014: John Hiatt – Terms of My Surrender (New West)
 2015: Gretchen Peters – Blackbirds (Scarlet Letter)
 2015: Ian McFeron – Radio (self-released)
 2021: Ian McFeron – West Wind (self-released)

As sideman

1982–1999
 1982: Nanci Griffith – Poet In My Window (Rounder) - electric guitar
 1989: The Questionnaires – Window To The World (EMI USA) - guitar
 1994: Todd Snider – Songs for the Daily Planet (MCA) - guitar on track 4 ("This Land Is Our Land")
 1995: Tom Ovans – Tales From The Underground (NSR) - electric guitar, acoustic guitar, accordion, bass, percussion
 1997: Matthew Ryan – May Day (A&M) - electric guitar, resonator guitar
 1998: Patty Griffin – Flaming Red (A&M) - guitar
 1998: Nanci Griffith – Other Voices, Too (A Trip Back to Bountiful) (Elektra) - vocals, acoustic guitar, electric guitar, gut-string guitar
 1998: Sarah Masen – Carry Us Through (re:think) - guitar
 1998: Tommy Womack – Positively Na Na (Checkered Past)
 1999: Nanci Griffith and the Blue Moon Orchestra with the London Symphony Orchestra – The Dust Bowl Symphony (Elektra) - electric guitar, acoustic guitar, resonator guitar
 1999: Troy Campbell – Man Vs. Beast (Blue Rose) - slide guitar

2000–2005
 2000: Steve Earle – Transcendental Blues (E-Squared) - guitar on track 10 ("When I Fall")
 2000: Michelle Tumes – Center Of My Universe (Sparrow) - guitar
 2000: Matthew Ryan – East Autumn Grin (A&M) - electric guitar, acoustic guitar, mandolin
 2001: Billy Joe Shaver – The Earth Rolls On (New West) - acoustic guitar, electric guitar 
 2001: Nanci Griffith – Clock Without Hands (Elektra) - electric guitar
 2001: Will Kimbrough – This (Waxysilver) - guitar
 2001: Maura O'Connell – Walls & Windows (Sugar Hill) - 12-string guitar
 2002: Jeff Finlin – Somewhere South Of Wonder (Gravity / BMG) - guitar
 2002: various artists – KGSR Broadcasts Vol. 10 (KGSR) - guitar on track 2-13 (Patty Griffin: "Rain")
 2004: Nanci Griffith – Hearts in Mind (New Door) - guitar
 2005: Strays Don't Sleep – Strays Don't Sleep (One Little Indian) - vocals, guitar, percussion
 2005: various artists – KGSR Broadcasts Vol. 13 (KGSR) - guitar, backing vocals on track 1-08 (Patty Griffin: "When It Don't Come Easy")

2006–present
 2006: Allison Moorer – Getting Somewhere (Sugar Hill) - guitar
 2007: Patty Griffin – Children Running Through (ATO) - acoustic guitar, electric guitar, autoharp 
 2007: Patty Griffin – Live from the Artists Den DVD (ATO) - guitar
 2008: Gretchen Peters – Northern Lights (Scarlet Letter) - electric guitar
 2008: Jeff Finlin – Ballad Of A Plain Man (Bent Wheel) - electric guitar, resonator guitar 
 2008: The Bittersweets – Goodnight, San Francisco (Compass) - electric guitar
 2009: Holly Williams – Here with Me (Mercury) - guitar
 2010: John Hiatt – The Open Road (New West) - guitar
 2011: John Hiatt – Dirty Jeans and Mudslide Hymns (New West) electric guitar, mandolin, 12-string guitar
 2012: Amelia White – Beautiful And Wild (White-Wolf) - electric guitar, mandolin
 2012: John Hiatt – Mystic Pinball (New West) - guitar, mandolin, resonator guitar
 2013: Patty Griffin – American Kid (New West) - guitar, mandolin
 2013: Scott Miller – Big Big World's (F.A.Y.) - guitar
 2014: Jennifer Knapp – Set Me Free (Righteous Babe) - guitar
 2021: Bob Dylan – Rough And Rowdy Ways Tour - guitar

References

External links
 
 

Living people
Alternative rock guitarists
Record producers from Tennessee
Year of birth missing (living people)